The Monday River is a river of Paraguay. It flows and empties into the Parana River, just south of the tri-border mark point of the Triple Frontier. Its primary course lies almost entirely within the Alto Parana Department.

See also
List of rivers of Paraguay

References
Rand McNally, The New International Atlas, 1993.
 GEOnet Names Server

Rivers of Paraguay
Tributaries of the Paraná River